Ross Greenburg (born c. 1955) was president of HBO Sports from 2000 to 2011.

He was an executive producer for HBO Sports in 1985.  During his tenure he won 51 Sports Emmys and 8 Peabody Awards. He succeeded Seth Abraham as president.

HBO Sports is famous for its series Sports of the 20th Century a series of sports documentaries produced by Greenburg, as well as the leading sports magazine show Real Sports with Bryant Gumbel, a football studio show led by Bob Costas, Dan Marino, Cris Carter, and Cris Collinsworth titled Inside the NFL and HBO World Championship Boxing. In 1990, he won the Sam Taub Award for excellence in boxing broadcasting journalism.  He graduated from Brown University in 1977.

References

External links
HBO Sports President Ross Greenburg Exiting Network After 33 Years
Greenburg out as president of HBO Sports
HBO Sports President Ross Greenburg exiting

Living people
American television producers
American television executives
Brown University alumni
1955 births
Scarsdale High School alumni
HBO Sports